State Road 510 (SR 510) is a  state highway in northern Indian River County, extending from U.S. Route 1 (US 1) in Wabasso to SR A1A in Orchid. The route acts primarily as a bridge across the Indian River, known as the Wabasso Causeway, the northernmost crossing of the Intracoastal Waterway in Indian River County. The entire highway is on the Indian River Lagoon Scenic Highway.

Route description

State Road 510 begins at US 1, and travels northeast towards the Indian River Lagoon. It crosses the Lagoon on two bridges, with Marshall Island, providing access to an environmental learning center in between the two bridges.  East of the river, SR 510 enters Wabasso Beach and heads east towards its eastern terminus of State Road A1A, one block west of the beach.  The Indian River Lagoon Scenic Highway turns north on A1A until Cape Canaveral.  The entire road is only 2 lanes wide, even at the causeway.

County Road 510
County Road 510 extends from CR 512 to US 1, providing access to farmlands south of Sebastian.

A block east of the road is US 1, ending CR 510. That section of Wabasso Road ends at 108th Avenue. For more information, see Wabasso Road West.

Major intersections

References

External links

Florida Route Log (SR 510)

510
510
510